Dave Barry (31 August 1888 – 22 July 1913) was an Australian rules footballer who played with South Melbourne in the Victorian Football League (VFL).

Barry, who came from local club Leopold, had a brief but successful career at South Melbourne. He was one of South Melbourne's half forward flankers in their 1909 premiership team. In 1910, his only other season, he appeared in a semi final and preliminary final.

After he moved to Western Australia, Barry began playing for Subiaco. He then joined the North Fremantle Football Club for the 1913 season. On the evening of 22 July that year, Barry was killed when he was run over by a train at a railway crossing. An inquiry cleared the train driver of any blame and was unable to determine what Barry was doing on the tracks.

References

1888 births
Australian rules footballers from Victoria (Australia)
Sydney Swans players
Sydney Swans Premiership players
Leopold Football Club (MJFA) players
Subiaco Football Club players
North Fremantle Football Club players
Railway accident deaths in Australia
Accidental deaths in Western Australia
1913 deaths
One-time VFL/AFL Premiership players